Degreed is an education technology company. Degreed is based in San Francisco, CA, with offices in Salt Lake City, UT, New York, London, Brisbane, Australia, and Leiden, The Netherlands.

History 
David Blake, David Wiley, and Eric Sharp founded Degreed in March 2012.

In November 2012, Degreed launched an early Beta to 20,000 users who joined as 'Founding Scholars' to the platform In January 2013, following a crowdfunded launch, Degreed launched to the public.

In the fall of 2014, the company launched the Degreed for Enterprise platform.

In March 2016, Degreed acquired European education technology startup, Gibbon.

In June 2018, Degreed acquired New Yorkbased online learning provider, Pathgather.

In December 2019, Degreed acquired London-based total talent platform, Adepto.

In August 2022, Degreed partnered with EasyGenerator allowing authors to publish, maintain, and update e-learning courses from EG directly to Degreed.

Reception
According to the director of Georgetown University's Center on Education and the Workforce, Anthony Carnevale, services such as Degreed only take into account the time spent learning, rather than how much has actually been learnt.

Degreed's customer base grew to nearly 100 clients following the launch of Degreed for Enterprise, winning multiple awards in 2015 and 2016.

In 2018, following the launch of Skill Certification, Degreed's client base grew to over 150 organizations.

References

Education companies of the United States
American companies established in 2012
Education companies established in 2012
Companies based in San Francisco
Companies based in Salt Lake City
E-learning